SW8 can refer to:
 EMD SW8
 (16453) 1989 SW8
 Star Wars: The Last Jedi, also known as Star Wars Episode VIII
 SW8 (roller coaster), a roller coaster at Alton Towers in Staffordshire, England.
 Renjong LRT station, Singapore

See also 

SW postcode area